Richard Prescott Keigwin  (8 April 1883 – 26 November 1972) was an English academic. He also played first-class cricket for Cambridge University, the Marylebone Cricket Club, Essex County Cricket Club and Gloucestershire County Cricket Club, and played hockey for Essex and England.

Early life and education
Keigwin was born in Lexden in Essex and educated at Clifton College (Watsons House) in Bristol.

He studied at Peterhouse, Cambridge, where he gained an MA in the Classics and Modern Languages Tripos. He was the editor of The Granta in 1919.

Sporting achievements
Whilst at Clifton, Keigwin partnered AEJ Collins in the school racquets pair (he was also the school racquets captain) and he captained the school cricket XI for 1902-3 when Collins also played.

In March 1903 Keigwin was runner-up at the Cambridge University's Freshmen's Lawn Tennis Tournament, losing in the final in two straight sets to future Wimbledon champion Tony Wilding without winning a game.

In addition to playing for the Marylebone Cricket Club at cricket, he also represented Cambridge University at cricket, rackets, football and hockey. He played hockey for Essex and England, and cricket and tennis for Gloucestershire. He also played for the Free Foresters against the Netherlands cricket XI in the 1920s, although he did not appear for Free Foresters at first-class level.

After the First World War, as a result of Keigwin's interest in Danish cricket, the game in Denmark picked up whilst he lived there and British cricket teams began visiting Denmark more frequently - these teams included the Marylebone Cricket Club (MCC), Leicestershire, Incogniti, Gentlemen of Worcestershire and Sir Julien Cahn's XI.

Keigwin's best bowling figures in first-class cricket were 8/79 against Sussex in 1903.
A year later, he scored his only first-class hundred, for Cambridge against Warwickshire.

His brothers, Herbert Keigwin and Henry Keigwin both also played first-class cricket.

War service and honours
In the first world war he was a Lieutenant in the Royal Naval Volunteer Reserve serving on the battlecruiser HMS Indomitable and stationed off the Belgian coast. He was present at the surrender of the German fleet. He was created a Chevalier of Belgian Order of Léopold, Knight of the Order of the Dannebrog by HM King Christian X of Denmark and awarded King Christian X's medal for "Valuable assistance rendered to Denmark during the war."

Published works

Lanyard Lyrics (1914)
Lyrics for Sport (1917)

Keigwin was a noted translator of Danish into English:
 Four Tales from Hans Andersen (1935)
Kaj Munk, Playwright, Priest and Patriot (1944)
The Jutland Wind (1944)
 In Denmark I Was Born (1948)
Denmark, Land of Beauty (1950)
 Fairy Tales by Hans Christian Andersen (1950, 3 vols)
 Tales the Moon Can Tell by Andersen (1955) 
Heinemann's Illustrated Hans Andersen Series (1955)
 Seven Tales from Hans Christian Andersen (1961)
Five Plays (1964)
The Ugly Duckling by Andersen (1973)
The Snow Queen: A Story in Seven Parts by Andersen (1975)
 80 Fairy Tales by Andersen (1976)

Keigwin also contributed to Centenary Essays on Clifton College (1962).

Occupation
Keigwin taught modern languages at the Royal Naval College, Osborne, and taught at Clifton College from 1919, as an assistant master (Master #246). He was House Tutor of Watson's House (his own old house) at Clifton College in 1919 and 1920, and was the Housemaster of Dakyns' House (Clifton College) from 1920 until 1935. Between 1935 and 1945, he was Warden of Wills Hall at Bristol University.

He was President of the Old Cliftonian Society from 1957 to 1959, and a Governor of Clifton College.

Keigwin died at Polstead in Suffolk and is buried in the churchyard of St Mary.

References

External links 

 Clifton College Register (1862–1962) published by the Old Cliftonian Society
 Full list of his published work at COPAC.ac.uk 

 

1883 births
1972 deaths
Military personnel from Colchester
Burials in Suffolk
English cricketers
Essex cricketers
Gloucestershire cricketers
Cambridge University cricketers
Marylebone Cricket Club cricketers
English male field hockey players
English racquets players
Instructors of the Royal Naval College, Osborne
People educated at Clifton College
Alumni of Peterhouse, Cambridge
Danish–English translators
Royal Navy officers of World War I
Royal Naval Volunteer Reserve personnel of World War I

Knights of the Order of the Dannebrog
Gentlemen of England cricketers
People from Colchester
People from Polstead
20th-century translators
H. D. G. Leveson Gower's XI cricketers